Keep the Aspidistra Flying (released in the United States, New Zealand, South Africa and Zimbabwe as A Merry War) is a 1997 British romantic comedy film directed by Robert Bierman and based on the 1936 novel by George Orwell. The screenplay was written by Alan Plater and was produced by Peter Shaw. The film stars Richard E. Grant and Helena Bonham Carter.

Plot
Gordon Comstock (Grant) is a successful copywriter at a flourishing advertising firm in 1930s London. His girlfriend and co-worker, Rosemary (Bonham Carter), fears he may never settle down with her when he suddenly disavows his money-based lifestyle and quits his job for the artistic satisfaction of writing poetry.

Cast
 Richard E. Grant as Gordon Comstock
 Helena Bonham Carter as Rosemary
 Julian Wadham as Ravelston
 Jim Carter as Erskine
 Harriet Walter as Julia Comstock
 Lesley Vickerage as Hermione
 Barbara Leigh-Hunt as Mrs. Wisbech (credited as Barbara Leigh Hunt)
 Liz Smith as Mrs. Meakin
 Dorothy Atkinson as Dora
 John Clegg as McKechnie
Bill Wallis as Mr Cheeseman
Lill Roughley as Mrs Trilling
Dorothea Alexander as Old Woman
Peter Stockbridge as Old Man
Grant Parsons as Beautiful young man
Malcolm Sinclair as Paul doring 
Derek Smee as Lecturer 
Ben Miles as Waiter
Richard Dixon as Head Waiter
 Eve Ferret as Barmaid

Production  
The title Keep the Aspidistra Flying is a pun on the socialist anthem "Keep the Red Flag Flying" but with the aspidistra houseplant instead representing middle-class English respectability.

Reception 
On Rotten Tomatoes the film has an approval rating of 83% based on reviews from 23 critics.

Derek Elley of Variety magazine, called it a terrific adaptation, and a "constant, often very funny delight to the ears". Elley praised the casting but was critical of the uncinematic direction.
Roger Ebert of the Chicago Sun-Times gave it 3 out of 4 and wrote: "For me it works not only as a reasonable adaptation of an Orwell novel I like, but also as a form of escapism, since if the truth be known I would be happy as a clerk in a London used-book store. For a time."
Lisa Schwarzbaum of Entertainment Weekly gave it a grade A−.

References

External links 
 

1997 films
Films based on works by George Orwell
British romantic comedy films
1997 romantic comedy films
1990s English-language films
Films directed by Robert Bierman
1990s British films